Albert John DeRogatis (May 5, 1927 – December 26, 1995) was an American football player and television and radio sportscaster.

Life and career
DeRogatis was born in Newark, New Jersey, and attended the city's Central High School, earning All-State honors at center.  At Duke University, after a knee injury shortened his junior season, he made the 1948 All-America team as a tackle.

He was drafted the following year by the New York Giants of the National Football League (NFL) and played defensive tackle. He was an NFL All-Pro in both 1950 and 1951. A recurrence of the knee injury he suffered at Duke ended his playing career after four seasons of professional football. For thirty-three years beginning in 1953, he served as a vice president with Prudential Insurance.

From 1966 through 1975, the bespectacled DeRogatis served as a color commentator for professional and college football telecasts on NBC, primarily with Curt Gowdy on the network's top broadcast team for American Football League (later, American Football Conference) regular-season and playoff matches, Super Bowls III, VII and IX and several Rose Bowls. He also was paired with Jim Simpson to call a few Orange Bowls. Prior to joining NBC, DeRogatis had begun his broadcasting career working with Marty Glickman on New York football Giants radio broadcasts on WNEW-AM from 1960 through 1965. DeRogatis was among several veteran announcers who returned to call some NFL telecasts for NBC in September 1988, while many of the network's regular broadcasters were busy calling that year's Summer Olympics in Seoul.

DeRogatis can be heard with Gowdy calling a football game in the 1978 film Heaven Can Wait.

DeRogatis was inducted into the College Football Hall of Fame in 1986.  A resident of Spring Lake, New Jersey, he died of cancer at Jersey Shore Medical Center on December 26, 1995.

Legacy
Sports Illustrated magazine's "Dr. Z" (aka Paul Zimmerman) has rated DeRogatis as his #1 football analyst of all time.

Upon his death in 1995, DeRogatis was eulogized in the Boston Globe as a prototype for what it means to be a gentleman, in the sense of displaying a gracious, polite, kind and generous nature.  The Globe also published a picture of DeRogatis in the NBC booth together with Curt Gowdy and Don Meredith in the 2006: The year in photos series, after Curt Gowdy's death in 2006.

References

External links
 "Al DeRogatis, 68, Sports Broadcaster," The New York Times, Wednesday, December 27, 1995.

1927 births
1995 deaths
American football centers
American Football League announcers
American people of Italian descent
Central High School (Newark, New Jersey) alumni
College football announcers
College Football Hall of Fame inductees
Deaths from cancer in New Jersey
Duke Blue Devils football players
Eastern Conference Pro Bowl players
National Football League announcers
New York Giants announcers
New York Giants players
People from Spring Lake, New Jersey
Players of American football from Newark, New Jersey